Ypsolopha frustella is a moth of the family Ypsolophidae. It is known from the United States, including California.

References

Ypsolophidae
Moths of North America